Barbara De Rossi (born 9 August 1960) is an Italian actress who has combined a career in international cinema with longstanding popularity in Italian television.

Biography
Barbara De Rossi was born in 1960 in Rome to an Italian wine importer and his German wife. She spent many of her early years in Rimini.

At the age of 15, De Rossi was spotted by director Alberto Lattuada in a beauty contest. Her film debut was in Lattuada's Stay As You Are (1978), alongside Marcello Mastroianni and Nastasia Kinski. She went on to play Virna Lisi's screen daughter in La Cicala (The Cricket) in 1980, again directed by Lattuada. In 1983, she played Bradamante, the famous female warrior, in Hearts and Armour directed by Giacomo Battiato. By the mid-1980s, she was gaining English-speaking roles such as the beautiful Greek slave girl Eunice in the TV miniseries Quo Vadis? and Claretta Petacci, Mussolini's mistress in the docudrama Mussolini and I alongside the actors Anthony Hopkins (Count Galeazzo Ciano) and Bob Hoskins (Mussolini). In 1990 she played Nys, a Montmartre prostitute, in Claude Chabrol's French-language film Quiet Days in Clichy, a dramatisation of Henry Miller's semiautobiographical novel based on his time in Paris. She has worked in film, theatre, and television since her debut, such as starring alongside Ray Lovelock in Raiuno's TV film Marco e Giulia – Inviati Speciali (Mark and Julia, Special Envoys).

In 1994, De Rossi shared the David di Donatello for Best Actress award with Asia Argento and Chiara Caselli for her part in the comic film Sentimental Maniacs. De Rossi has served as a judge on the junior talent show Ti lascio una canzone broadcast on Rai Uno since 2008.

Personal life
In 1988, De Rossi married Andrea Busiri Vici, scion of a famous architectural dynasty. They were divorced in 1990. 
De Rossi's second husband is the dancer Branislav Tesanovic with whom she has a daughter.

Public life
De Rossi is honorary president of "I Diritti Civili nel 2000", a civil-rights organization representing the interests of women and children.

Filmography

References

External links

Italian film actresses
Italian television actresses
Italian stage actresses
1960 births
Living people
Actresses from Rome
Italian people of German descent